Kahshur may refer to:
 Kahshur-e Ali Nazer
 Kahshur-e Davud Ali
 Kahshur-e Olya